Petyarre is a surname. Notable people with surname include.

Gloria Petyarre (born 1938), Australian Aboriginal artist
Jeanna Petyarre (born 1950), Australian Aboriginal artist
Kathleen Petyarre (c.1940-2018), Australian Aboriginal artist
Nancy Petyarre (1934/1939-2009), Australian Aboriginal artist